Piltzville is a census-designated place (CDP) in Missoula County, Montana, United States. The population was 395 at the 2010 census.

Demographics

History 
The Piltzville neighborhood was home to workers at the lumber mill in Bonner. It is named after Billy Pilz, who became a yard boss at the Bonner Mill. His house was built in 1904.

Artist Michael Cadieux, known for his watercolors and oil paintings on environmental themes, is a native of Piltzville.

Climate
This climatic region is typified by large seasonal temperature differences, with warm to hot (and often humid) summers and cold (sometimes severely cold) winters.  According to the Köppen Climate Classification system, Piltzville has a humid continental climate, abbreviated "Dfb" on climate maps. Piltzville is located at the base of Bonner Mountain, and sheltered from the winds.

References

Census-designated places in Missoula County, Montana
Census-designated places in Montana